Jennifer Lee Stauber  (known as Jenny Stauber) is an Australian ecotoxicologist and chief research scientist at the CSIRO Land and Water.

Education 
Stauber graduated from the University of Sydney in 1979 with a BSc in biochemistry and microbiology and MSc for her thesis titled "Photosynthetic pigments in marine diatoms" in 1984. In 1996, she completed a PhD titled "Toxicity of Metals in Biological Systems" at the University of Tasmania.

Career 
Stauber joined CSIRO Fisheries and Oceanography as a research scientist in 1979, moving to CSIRO Energy Chemistry in 1983 in the same role. In 2006, she transferred to CSIRO Land and Water where she was promoted to deputy chief in 2008.

Awards and recognition 
In 2015, Stauber was elected Fellow of the Australian Academy of Technology and Engineering (FTSE) and in 2020 Fellow of the Australian Academy of Science. She was awarded CSIRO's Lifetime Achievement Award in 2018 in recognition of her "exceptional science leadership and landmark research on the bioavailability and toxicity of metals underpinning the national water and sediment quality guidelines for environmental protection in Australia and globally".

Selected publications

References

External links 

 CSIRO profile
 

Living people
Year of birth missing (living people)
University of Sydney alumni
University of Tasmania alumni
Australian women scientists
Fellows of the Australian Academy of Science
Fellows of the Australian Academy of Technological Sciences and Engineering